The 1901 New Hampshire football team was an American football team that represented New Hampshire College of Agriculture and the Mechanic Arts during the 1901 college football season—the school became the University of New Hampshire in 1923. The team finished with a record of 0–6, and did not score any points during the season.

Schedule
Scoring during this era awarded five points for a touchdown, one point for a conversion kick (extra point), and five points for a field goal. Teams played in the one-platoon system and the forward pass was not yet legal. Games were played in two halves rather than four quarters.

The team's original schedule had included games against Burdett College, Tufts, and MIT.

The October 2 contest was the first game of the Dartmouth–New Hampshire football rivalry.

In addition to the varsity games listed above, New Hampshire's second team (reserves) defeated South Berwick Academy, 11–6, and lost to a team of Exeter Academy juniors, 23–0. A team of New Hampshire freshmen defeated Newmarket High School, 22–0.

Notes

References

Further reading
 

New Hampshire
New Hampshire Wildcats football seasons
College football winless seasons
New Hampshire football